Maria (Maj) Lind, née Kopjeff (1876–1942) 

was a philanthropist, who studied piano in Kuopio and Saint Petersburg.  She married a Helsinki businessman, Arvid Lind,
and inherited a considerable fortune when he died.  She left a bequest "for the development of pianists" to the Sibelius Academy.
This money was used to fund the International Maj Lind Piano Competition, which has been held every five years since 2002 
.

References 

Finnish patrons of the arts